SuperM (Hangul: 슈퍼엠) is a South Korean supergroup formed in 2019 by SM Entertainment and Capitol Music Group. The group consists of seven members from four SM Entertainment boy bands: Taemin from Shinee, Baekhyun and Kai from Exo, Taeyong and Mark from NCT 127, and Ten and Lucas from WayV. The group debuted on October 4, 2019, with their self-titled EP, which entered the US Billboard 200 at number one, making SuperM the first Asian artist in history to top the chart with a debut release. Their debut single, "Jopping", was among Billboard's Critics' Picks for the "25 Best K-pop Songs" of 2019.

History

Background and formation 
All members of SuperM came from existing boy groups under SM Entertainment. Taemin had been an active artist since the age of 14, when he debuted as a member of Shinee in May 2008. Baekhyun and Kai debuted as members of Exo in April 2012. They have also been members of Exo's Korean sub-unit Exo-K since April 2012, and Baekhyun has been a member of its R&B-oriented sub-unit Exo-CBX since October 2016. Taeyong, Ten, and Mark debuted as members of NCT in April 2016, and Lucas debuted as a member of NCT in January 2018. Taeyong and Mark were added to NCT's Seoul-based sub-unit, NCT 127, in July 2016. Mark also debuted as a member of NCT's then-teenaged sub-unit NCT Dream in August 2016, while Ten and Lucas were added to NCT's China-based sub-unit, WayV, in January 2019.

In 2019, before the official announcement of SuperM's debut, there had been rumors that SM Entertainment was planning to debut a "K-pop Super Boy Band". On August 7, 2019, Capitol Music Group chairman Steve Barnett and SM Entertainment founder Lee Soo-man officially announced the group as SuperM at Capitol Congress 2019. The "M" in SuperM stands for both Matrix and Master, since each member was already an established star in their own groups. The teaser revealed the group members, each excelling in dance performance, vocals, and rap. Described as "the Avengers of K-pop", the group was to be focused more on performance-based music. SM A&R executive and director Chris Lee stated that the group had been in the works for around one year. Lee felt the analogy to the Avengers was apt: "Each Avenger has their own group and Iron Man has his own movie and Thor has his own, but together, they have an even greater synergy, so like that the members will pursue their own careers and own groups but also join together with synergy—a positive one".

Audiences and followers had mixed opinions on the project at first. Some fans are enthusiastic about the band's debut following the release of the first teaser at Capitol Congress 2019. Meanwhile, others were concerned about SM Entertainment prioritizing existing groups, Exo members establish solo careers before their mandatory military service, and the group debuting in the United States rather than starting with Korean promotions. Writing for MTV News, Caitlin Kelley opines that "the biggest takeaway from the backlash is that it's not that easy to combine the powers of multiple fandoms" and felt that the group's structure might be complicated for American audiences, although she noted that "the fact that SuperM trended worldwide for several hours shows potential. That level of engagement means that there is widespread interest in the group—now it's just a matter of turning public opinion around". Kate Halliwell of The Ringer wrote, "plenty of people support several groups within the K-pop genre at large, and it makes sense to target them whenever possible ... but the toxic side of fandom is difficult to escape". She added that the formation of the group "once again [proves] how online backlash is inevitable, and often overwhelming when it comes to navigating multiple K-pop fandoms at once", although she felt that the formation of the group "[signifies] a rising tide in Western K-pop demand".

2019: Debut and initial success
SuperM promoted their debut album both in the US and in South Korea. Several teasers were posted on SuperM's various social media channels. The group filmed their debut music video in Dubai in August 2019. The group's self-titled debut EP was released on October 4, with the instrumental of one of the album's songs, "I Can't Stand the Rain", released on August 28. SuperMs lead single, "Jopping", was released alongside its music video on the same day as the EP, which debuted at number one at the Billboard 200 albums chart with 168,000 equivalent album units in the week ending October 10.

SuperM held their debut concert at the Capitol Records Building in Los Angeles on October 5 and made their television debut on The Ellen DeGeneres Show on October 9. The group then embarked on their first tour, We Are the Future Live, with ten dates in North America from November 2019 to February 2020. The tour extended to Latin America and Europe with three shows in February 2020. The group sold-out their stop at the second largest indoor arena in the UK, the O2 Arena, among others. Their Tokyo Dome concert, which was initially scheduled for April 23, was indefinitely postponed due to the COVID-19 pandemic. The group participated in the online concert series, One World: Together at Home, on April 18, to support the COVID-19 Solidarity Response Fund from the World Health Organization, as well as promote social distancing. The group performed an unreleased song, "With You", from separate locations.

2020–present: Super One and military service
In April 2020, SuperM became the first group from SM Entertainment to hold a live online concert, entitled Beyond the Future, jointly organised by SM Entertainment and Naver as part of the world first online-dedicated live concert series, Beyond LIVE. For their concert on April 26, they performed songs from their debut album as well as new tracks from an upcoming unannounced release, playing to a live audience of more than 75,000 paying real-time viewers from over 109 countries. The revenue from the online concert, from pure ticket sales excluding merchandise, has been estimated at US$2 million.

In August 2020, the group announced their first studio album, Super One, for a September 2020 release. The album release was preceded by a pre-release single, "100", released on August 14. SuperM made their US morning television debut through video call on Good Morning America on August 20 with a performance of "100". In a brief interview prior to the group's performance, Mark explained that the audience was witnessing the exact same set that they used for their Beyond LIVE concert in April.

On August 26, SuperM won the Seoul Mayor Award at the 2020 Newsis K-Expo, making it the group's first award since their debut. The second pre-release single, "Tiger Inside", from SuperM's first studio album was released on September 1. It eventually became the group's first song to enter the Gaon Digital Chart.

On September 25, SuperM revealed its collaboration with Marvel for a limited edition merchandise series alongside the release of Super One and the album's third and lead single "One (Monster & Infinity)".  The album debuted at number two on the Billboard 200 with 104,000 equivalent album units. It became the group's second top three entry after their debut EP. SuperM participated in on online advocacy event for mental health, The Big Event, by the World Health Organization on October 10. The group performed "Better Days" during the event, which was broadcast live on the WHO's Facebook, Twitter, LinkedIn, YouTube and TikTok channels.

Baekhyun enlisted as part of South Korean mandatory military service on May 6, 2021, becoming the group's first member to enlist. Taemin became the group's second member to enlist on May 31.

Endorsements

SuperM were announced as global ambassadors for Korean Air in November 2019. On November 4, the group was featured alongside SM labelmate BoA in Korean Air's safety video, which was added to all Korean Air flights on the same day. The song featured in the video, "Let's Go Everywhere", was released on November 18, and proceeds of the song were donated to Global Poverty Project's Global Citizen campaign.

Following their safety video feature, the group was also advertised through livery sported by one of Korean Air’s Boeing 777-300ER, registered as HL8010. The livery is a picture of the group's seven members with the group's name logo below it and is situated at the aft part of the aircraft.

In January 2021, insurance company Prudential announced a collaborative campaign with SuperM called “We DO Well Together." The campaign encourages people to maintain good health and to spread positivity. As part of the campaign, the group released a promotional single, "We Do", which was released alongside its music video on April 9. Prudential hosted a virtual fan meeting and concert, with Taeyong, Ten, Lucas, and Mark attending due to Baekhyun and Taemin serving in the military and Kai being under self-quarantine after fellow Exo member Xiumin tested positive for COVID-19; Baekhyun, Taemin, and Kai appeared through pre-recorded video.

Members
 Baekhyun  – leader
 Taemin 
 Kai 
 Taeyong 
 Ten 
 Lucas 
 Mark 

Discography

 Studio albums 

 Extended plays 

Singles

 Promotional singles 

Other charted songs

Filmography
Music videos

TV shows

 Concerts and tours SuperM: We Are the Future Live' is SuperM's first world tour, promoting their eponymous debut album. The tour was officially announced on October 2, 2019, with tickets going on sale on October 5, 2019. The tour began on November 11, 2019, in Fort Worth and initially visited nine cities in North America. An extension to the tour began on February 9, 2020, in Latin America, Europe, and Asia.

Set list 
Set list of the first show in Fort Worth:

– VCR 1 – Intro
 "I Can't Stand The Rain" + Dance Performance
 "Danger" + "Goodbye"
 "GTA"
 "Super Car"
 "Dream in a Dream" + "New Heroes"
 "Bass Go Boom"
 "Betcha" + "UN Village"
 "Dangerous Woman"
 "2 Fast"
 "Baby Don't Stop"
 "Talk About"
 "Confession"

Encore:
 "No Manners"
 "With You"
 "Jopping"

Tour dates

Cancelled shows

Awards and nominations

Notes

References

External links

SuperM official website 
SuperM official Japanese website (in Japanese)

 
SM Entertainment
Shinee
Exo
NCT (band)
South Korean boy bands
Pop music supergroups
Musical groups established in 2019
EMI Records artists
Capitol Records artists
Caroline Records artists
Universal Music Group artists
2019 establishments in South Korea